Lama Tsultrim Allione (born Joan Rousmanière Ewing in 1947) is an American author and teacher who has studied in Tibetan Buddhism's Karma Kagyu lineage.

Biography

Early life and education
She was born in 1947 in Maine under the name Joan Rousmanière Ewing.

Recognition
In Tibetan Buddhism it is believed that once beings such as Machig Labdrön attain enlightenment, they are no longer subject to the limitation of one body and may emanate into many different dimensions and forms. An emanation continues the work of the original incarnation. In May and June 2007 Allione led a pilgrimage to Nepal and Tibet which included a visit to Sangri Khangmar (Sangri County) where Machig Labdrön lived from the age of 37 to 99.  At the site, Allione was recognized as an emanation of Machig Labdrön  by the resident Lama, Karma Dorje Rinpoche, the 7th incarnation of the brother of Mikyö Dorje, the 8th Karmapa. Lama Karma Nyitön Kunkhyab Chökyi Dorje offered Allione a self-arisen golden crystal phurba (ceremonial dagger), the only remaining tsa tsa made from the ashes of Machig's body (a mixture of clay and ash imprinted with an image of Machig dancing), texts of Machig's teachings, a hat with symbolic meaning designed by Machig, and various other treasures. Allione was also independently recognised as Machig's emanation in Nepal by Lama Tsering Wangdu Rinpoche, holder of the lineage of Dampa Sangye (who had worked with Machig Labdrön to establish the Chöd practice in Tibet in the 11th Century). Commenting on the recognition as Machig Labdrön, Lama Tsultrim said she thought the purpose wasto make this new phase of collecting Machig's lineage more empowered. Recognition allows more energy to flow, and Machig's blessings can manifest more fully. It's a kind of mirroring from the outside validating our heartfelt intention to reinvigorate and spread Machig's lineage in the West. It also felt very natural. We will keep doing what we have been doing already, but the recognition creates an auspicious interdependence for the teachings.

Activities
In 2008 Lama Tsultrim Allione's book Feeding Your Demons was published, an approach based on the Chöd lineage of Machig Labdrön that Allione has practiced since 1973. Allione opens chapter five of the book by quoting Carl Jung as saying "One does not become enlightened by imagining figures of light but by making the darkness conscious."

Mark Epstein has described her work as "a book that Carl Jung could only have dreamed of writing."
Allione claims that the "process of feeding our demons is a method for bringing our shadow into consciousness and accessing the treasures it holds rather than repressing it."

In 2009, Lama Tsultrim Allione was selected by an esteemed committee of scholars and practitioners to receive the international “Outstanding Woman in Buddhism” Award given in Bangkok, Thailand.

Lama Tsultrim completed her book, Wisdom Rising: Journey into the Mandala of the Empowered Feminine, published by Simon and Schuster in May 2018. At the same time, Lama Tsultrim continues to guide Tara Mandala and thousands of students around the world. Her writings and teachings come from her sublime Tibetan lamas as well as her experience as a Western woman and mother. She is known for her ability to translate the wisdom of the ancient Tibetan Buddhist tradition into clear teachings that are relatable and relevant to Western audiences.

Works

Books
 

Allione, Tsultrim (2018). Wisdom Rising: Journey Into the Mandala of the Empowered Feminine. Simon & Schuster.

Audio

Allione, Tsultrim (2018) Wisdom Rising: Journey into the Mandala of the Empowered Feminine Audible Audiobook – Unabridged ©2018 Simon and Schuster (P)2018 Joan E Allione

See also
Shadow (psychology)

References

Further reading
What is a Demon? Tsultrim Allione: "When Machig Labdrön was directly asked by her son Tönyon Samdrup to define demons, she replied this way: “That which is called a demon is not some great black thing that petrifies whoever sees it. A demon is anything that obstructs the achievement of freedom…. There is no greater devil than this fixation to a self. So until this ego-fixation is cut off, all the demons wait with open mouths. For this reason, you need to exert yourself at a skillful method to sever the devil of ego-fixation."

External links

 Women of Wisdom extract (Machig Lapdron's life and teaching)
 Feeding Your Demons extract)
 Kapala Training
 Lama Tsultrim Allione podcast
 Tara Mandala
 Machig Labdron's Cave (Part III — Pilgrimage to Nepal and Tibet)
 Inviting the demon. (Milarepa, Tibetan Buddhism) (The Shadowissue) Judith Simmer-Brown, Parabola Vol.22 No.2 (Summer 1997) pp. 12–18
 Feeding Your Demons: Life and Work of Lama Tsultrim Allione. Video documentary

American Buddhist nuns
American Buddhists
Living people
Karma Kagyu lamas
Tibetan Buddhism writers
Tibetan Buddhist nuns
Tibetan Buddhist spiritual teachers
Tibetan Buddhist yogis
Women yogis
Tibetan Buddhists from the United States
1947 births
20th-century Buddhist nuns
21st-century Buddhist nuns
21st-century American women